Howa Golden Bear is a bolt-action rifle that was manufactured by Howa Industries in the past.

Overview
Howa Industries established their firearms manufacturing plant in 1960 after World War II. In the same year, Howa released the M300 as a hunting gun for domestic markets. Soon after releasing the Howa M300, the company began working on a new type of a hunting rifle in order to meet the demand for large-caliber bolt-action rifles in Japan. During the development, the designers used the Finnish SAKO L61R "Finnbear" as basis of the design.

In 1967, Howa introduced the Howa Golden Bear large-caliber rifle at the US Open rifle exhibition in Chicago, USA. At the time, it was the only large caliber hunting rifle available domestically in Japan.

The Golden Bear was launched in Japan and the United States in 1967, and the export specification grades were three types: deluxe, presentation, and medallion. In Japan, only the deluxe model was sold.

In United States, the Howa rifles were sold by Dickson Roses company as "Dickson-Howa Golden Bear". Also in the US Market, Weatherby, which had a business connections with Howa, also sold Howa rifles (OEM) under the name of Weatherby Vanguard.

In 1979, an updated design/model of the Howa Golden Bear, the M1500 was introduced, with the older Golden Bear model becoming discontinued in same year.

Design

Howa Golden Bear is very similar to its parent weapon, the Sako L61R "Finnbear".

Use by Japanese law-enforcement
Despite being designed for hunting first, the Golden Bear was adopted by elements within Japanese law-enforcement.

Based on the lessons learned from the Kin Kiro Incident in 1968, the National Police Agency deployed a Golden Bear rifles to the prefectural police as equipment for taking down criminals and rescuing hostages. Additionally, all police Golden Bear rifles came with a scope.

When the Setouchi Seajacking incident occurred in 1970, the Osaka Prefectural Police Special Gun Corps (currently the Anti-Firearms Squadron) sniper took down the criminal with a Golden Bear rifle, allowing other officers to rescue the hostages.

The Golden Bear is also said to have used the Tokyo Metropolitan Police Department's Special Squadron (now the SAT).

According to Megumi Tsukiji of Far East Gun Sales, the Golden Bear used by the Japanese police was chambered in .30-06 Springfield and equipped with an Bushnell Corporation 3-9 scope with magnification.

Notes

References

Hunting rifles
Bolt-action rifles of Japan
Sniper rifles of Japan
Police weapons